West Kotawaringin Regency is one of the thirteen regencies which comprise the Central Kalimantan Province on the island of Kalimantan (Borneo), Indonesia. The population of West Kotawaringin Regency was 235,803 at the 2010 Census and 270,400 at the 2020 Census; the official estimate as at mid 2021 was 272,531. The town of Pangkalan Bun is the capital of West Kotawaringin Regency.  The regency has an area of about 10,759 km2.

Administrative Districts 
West Kotawaringin Regency consists of six districts (kecamatan), tabulated below with their areas and population totals from the 2010 Census and the 2020 Census, together with the official estimates as at mid 2021. The table also includes the locations of the district administrative centres, the number of administrative villages (rural desa and urban kelurahan) in each district, and its postal codes.

References

Regencies of Central Kalimantan